Fred S. Fraenkel is an investment professional and vice chair of Cowen Inc. He was on the Barron's year end roundtable for four years and managed large research organizations at several Wall Street firms. He ran his own venture fund for eight years and was until September 2015 the president and chief research officer of a Miami-based advisor of mutual funds.

Early life and education
Fraenkel received a B.S. in economics and finance from Lehigh University, and an M.B.A. from the Wharton School of the University of Pennsylvania. Fraenkel was elected to membership of Beta Gamma Sigma and Omicron Delta Epsilon the national business school and economics honorary societies.

Career
Fraenkel has spent over  40 years in investing, and his career includes being a member of Barron's year-end roundtable from 1982 to 1985, and heading global research at Lehman Brothers from 1987 to 1993. During that time, Lehman Brothers had its first number-one ranking in the Institutional Investor rankings. He is currently  a vice chairman of Cowen Group, an investment bank and asset manager in New York.  Until September 2015 he was chief research officer of Fairholme Capital Management, an advisor to value-oriented mutual funds founded by Bruce Berkowitz.  Prior to Fairholme he was vice chairman of Beacon Trust Company in Morristown, New Jersey for three years and prior to that he was a founding partner of Millennium 3 Capital.  Millennium 3 was a venture firm specializing in early-stage companies. Before founding Millennium 3 Capital in 2000, Fraenkel served as vice chairman of ING Barings Furman Selz and chief operating officer of Furman Selz. Before joining Furman Selz in March 1995, Fraenkel spent nine years at Lehman Brothers, where he was a managing director and director of global research, overseeing 110 analysts located in New York, London, Tokyo and Hong Kong. As global research director, Fraenkel was responsible for managing the department's ascension in the Institutional Investor poll from a rank of 15th in 1987 to 1st in 1990, 1991, and 1992.

Prior to Lehman Brothers, Fraenkel was chairman and chief executive officer of Market America Group, an investment advisory firm. He also spent four and a half years as director of equity research and a member of the board of directors at Prudential Securities. Fraenkel began his Wall Street career in 1974 as a securities analyst with Goldman Sachs & Company, and was chief investment strategist for E. F. Hutton & Co. from 1980 to 1982.

Affiliations
Mr. Fraenkel is a member of the CFA Institute, New York Society of Security Analysts and the AIMR. He is a past chairman of the board of advisors of the College of Business and Economics of Lehigh University. Fraenkel guest lectures at Harvard Business School, Harvard Law School, Columbia University Business School and Lehigh University College of Business and Economics.

Personal life
Fraenkel is married to Andrea Silberg Fraenkel and has three children, and five grandchildren.  He resides in Boca Raton, Florida.

References

Barron's Year End Rountable Editions for 1982, 1983, 1984 and 1985.
WSJ Who's News article on page 1 announcing the departure of Mr. Fraenkel from Lehman Brothers February 1994.
Biography section of Millennium 3 Capital website (www.mill3cap.com), Clear Asset Management website (www.clearam.com), Invention Machine website (www.invention-machine.com)
Investment News – Beacon Trust Buys Clear Asset Management http://www.investmentnews.com/apps/pbcs.dll/article?AID=/20081203/REG/812039977/-1/rss02
www.foxnews.com
http://www.dailyfinance.com/2013/01/03/fairholme-announces-appointment-of-fred-fraenkel-a/

Year of birth missing (living people)
Living people
People from Miami Beach, Florida
Lehigh University alumni
Wharton School of the University of Pennsylvania alumni